Geir Dahlen (born 27 June 1960) is a Norwegian former cyclist. He competed in the road race at the 1988 Summer Olympics.

References

External links
 

1960 births
Living people
Norwegian male cyclists
Olympic cyclists of Norway
Cyclists at the 1988 Summer Olympics
Sportspeople from Tønsberg